Yuri Mikhailovich Antonov (born 19 February 1945 in Tashkent, Uzbek SSR, Soviet Union) is a Soviet and Russian composer, singer and musician, People's Artist of Russia (1997).

Biography
Yuri Mikhailovich Antonov was born into the family of an officer of the Soviet Army, Mikhail Vasilievich Antonov, who after World War II stayed to serve in the military administration of Berlin. Yuri's sister, Zhanna (Jane) was born there. His mother, Natalya Mikhailovna (Litovchenko), who was from Kremenchuk (Poltava Region), died in 2008 at age 85.

Antonov is one of the most popular and successful artists on Soviet 70's-80's pop scene despite the fact that some of his songs (especially in early period) were banned by Soviet censorship. He appeared to an international television audience as a performer in the opening ceremony of the Moscow 1986 Goodwill Games.

Awards 
 Antonov was named a Distinguished Artist of Chechnya-Ingushetia (1983) and a People's Artist of Russia in 1997.
 He is the recipient of the Order "For Merit to the Fatherland" (4th class), Order of Honour (Russia), Order of Friendship (Russia), and Order of Francysk Skaryna.
 In 1997 Yuri Antonov received a star on the  Star Square in Moscow.
 He also received the Living Legend Award at the Ovation Awards in 2000.

References

External links
 

Official site (in Russian)
Official page on Youtube
Yuri Antonov at the Forbes 
 

Popular songs
  
 
 
 
 
 
  
 
 
 
 
 
 

1945 births
Living people
Russian composers
Russian male composers
New wave musicians
Russian film score composers
Male film score composers
Russian people of Ukrainian descent
People's Artists of Russia
Musicians from Tashkent
Soviet male singers
Soviet composers
Soviet male composers
Russian accordionists
21st-century accordionists
20th-century Russian male singers
20th-century Russian singers
21st-century Russian male musicians
Recipients of the Order "For Merit to the Fatherland", 4th class
Winners of the Golden Gramophone Award